Poma is a French company which manufactures cable-driven lift systems.

Poma may also refer to:


People
 Poma (surname)
 Saint Poma, late 3rd century Roman saint

Places
 La Poma Department, Argentina, a department in Salta Province
 La Poma, a village and rural municipality, capital of the department

Other uses
 Grupo Poma, an El Salvadoran company
 PomA, a protein
 Tinetti test or Performance Oriented Mobility Assessment (POMA), a test for assessing a person's balance abilities

See also
 Pomas, a commune in France